Thinking of Home is an album by jazz saxophonist Hank Mobley recorded on July 31, 1970 but not released by the Blue Note label until 1980. It features performances by Mobley with trumpeter Woody Shaw, pianist Cedar Walton, guitarist Eddie Diehl, bassist Mickey Bass, and drummer Leroy Williams. This was Mobley's 26th (and final) recording for Blue Note.

Reception

Allmusic awarded the album 4½ stars and the review by Scott Yanow stated "It is only fitting that Hank Mobley would record one of the last worthwhile Blue Note albums before its artistic collapse (it would not be revived until the 1980s) for his consistent output helped define the label's sound in the 1960s".

On All About Jazz Richton Guy Thomas said "this is a fitting farewell session. It features the powerful trumpet playing of Woody Shaw and the exciting pianist Cedar Walton. Hank Mobley's playing has a fire that ought to remind you of the Jazz Messengers, as it should since he was one of the original members of the group ... Thinking of Home should remind diehard jazz fans (and enlighten those newer to the genre) that Mobley was an innovative and stimulating tenor saxophonist who consistently swung".

Track listing 
All compositions by Hank Mobley except where noted
 "Suite: Thinking of Home/The Flight/Home at Last" - 10:06
 "Justine" - 13:04
 "You Gotta Hit It" - 5:34
 "Gayle's Groove" (Mickey Bass) - 5:33
 "Talk About Gittin' It" - 8:38

Personnel 
 Hank Mobley — tenor saxophone
 Woody Shaw — trumpet
 Cedar Walton — piano
 Eddie Diehl — guitar
 Mickey Bass — bass
 Leroy Williams — drums

References

1980 albums
Albums produced by Duke Pearson
Albums produced by Francis Wolff
Blue Note Records albums
Hank Mobley albums
Albums recorded at Van Gelder Studio